Anatoma proxima is a species of minute sea snail, a marine gastropod mollusk in the family Scissurellidae.

Description
The shell grows to a length of 3 mm.

Distribution
This species occurs in the Atlantic Ocean along the Southeastern coast of the US.

References

External links
 

Anatomidae
Gastropods described in 1927